

2000

See also
 2000 in Australia
 2000 in Australian television
 List of 2000 box office number-one films in Australia

2000
Lists of 2000 films by country or language
Films